The Brownson House is a non-profit charitable organization in providing recreation, education,  and character development services in Washington, Pennsylvania.  The organization's primary facility provides athletic venues for  flag football, basketball, boxing, cheerleading, dance classes, indoor soccer, inline hockey, lacrosse, and volleyball.  It is affiliated with the local chapter of the United Way.

The origins of the Brownson House date to 1926 when Mrs. Paul Offill and 12 members of the Daughters of current Events Club began giving cooking and sewing classes.  In 1928, a Boy's Club was added with the help of Washington & Jefferson College student volunteers.  In 1934, the first permanent location was acquired on Weirich Avenue Settlement House; the organization merged with the local Community Chest and renamed the Neighborhood House Association.  In 1937, the entity moved to the former Tyler Tube and Pipe Company building, where it currently resides.  James I. Brownson, a Washington County judge purchased the building on behalf of the group.  Upon his death, it was renamed The Brownson House in his honor.

In 1952, Art Sandusky was hired to be director, a position he held for 30 years.  The Sandusky family, including Art's son Jerry Sandusky, lived in an apartment in the rec center.  The football field is now called "Art Sandusky Field."

It housed Kindergarten classes, to be followed by nursery classes when kindergarten was added by local schools.  The T. S. Fitch Memorial Gymnasium, named for a prominent benefactor and volunteer, was built in 1962.  In 2002, the organization was inducted into the Pennsylvania Sports Hall of Fame

The Brownson House joined with the City of Washington, Pennsylvania to build the Vernon C. Neal Sportsplex, part of Washington Park, in 2004.

Following the child sex abuse trial of Jerry Sandusky, journalist Marty Griffin from KDKA reported that several individuals had accused Sandusky of assaulting them during his time at the Brownson House.

Notes

References

External links
Brownson House homepage

Washington County, Pennsylvania
Charities based in Pennsylvania